Helvey may refer to:

Helvey, Missouri, an extinct town in Reynolds County
Helvey, Nebraska, an unincorporated community in Jefferson County